Werauhia vietoris is a plant species in the genus Werauhia. This species is endemic to Costa Rica.

References

vietoris
Endemic flora of Costa Rica